The Scottsdale McDowell Sonoran Preserve is a large, permanently protected, sustainable desert habitat in Scottsdale, Arizona.

The preserve encompasses some  contiguously, and is the largest urban park (technically "nature reserve") in the United States. The preserve lands were purchased via a sales tax increment approved by Scottsdale voters, and the preserve is supported in-part by the McDowell Sonoran Conservancy.

Recreation 
The trailhead gates are open from sunrise to sunset and there is no charge for access or parking.

Popular activities include hiking (guided & self-guided), mountain biking, rock climbing, running, & horseback riding.

References

Scottsdale, Arizona